Littell, Littel or Litel is a surname. Notable people with the surname include:

 Alfred B. Littell (1893–1970), American politician
 Alison Littell McHose (born 1965), American politician, Robert and Virginia Littell's daughter
 Dave Littell (born 1953), American Olympic fencer 
 Eliakim Littell (1797–1870), American founder of the periodical Littell's Living Age
 Emlen T. Littell (1840–1891), American architect
 Franklin Littell (1917–2009), American Protestant scholar
 Isaac Littell (1857–1924), United States Army brigadier general
 John Litel (1892–1972), American film and television actor
 Jonathan Littell (born 1967), Robert Littell's son and also a writer
 Mark Littell (1953–2022), American Major League Baseball pitcher
 Robert E. Littell (1936–2014), American politician, Alfred B. Littell's son
 Robert Littell (author) (born 1935), American writer
 Ross F. Littell (1924–2000), American textile and furniture designer
 Samuel Harrington Littell (1873–1967), Episcopal bishop of Hawaii
 Stuart Litel (born 1961), American software consultant
 Virginia Littell (born 1943), American politician, Robert Littell's wife
 Zack Littell (born 1995), American Major League Baseball pitcher